is a Japanese manga series written and illustrated by Riichi Ueshiba. The series is a spin-off of Ueshiba's earlier manga, Discommunication. It was made into an anime television series produced by Madhouse that aired on some UHF stations and ABC Television.

Plot
The series revolves around dream masters who turn nightmares into peaceful dreams. On behalf of their clients they go around searching for nightmares which have escaped the mind of the owner and have manifested themselves into the real world, causing havoc. The nightmares are a paranormal phenomenon which have the appearance of poltergeist activity. The dream masters' goal is to defeat the nightmares, and returning them to their respective owners as pacified dreams. However, the dream masters do not interfere with an owner's life, and the owner is left to deal with the source of the nightmare. The show is characterised by haunting music, strange ghost like nightmares and the transformation of children's toys known as "play offerings" into weaponry and monsters.

Unlike the anime, the manga is a lot more in-depth with the cases, for example, the first case takes up the entire first three volumes. Also, they don't just pacify nightmares and expel them from the real world, but instead they take all sorts of cases, where no dreaming is involved, but their power is required.

Characters

Dream Users
   - Nichiyousei Yume Tsukai (Sunday Star)
 
As Rinko's older sister, she took over their father's practice after he was killed during a battle. Somewhat anemic, she spends most of her time sleeping in the odd toyshop where they are based from. Because she mostly stays at the shop and wears an overall skirt and geta, Rinko dubs her as a hermit and wishes her sister would get out more. Touko wears her father's kitsune noh mask, and doesn't go anywhere without it. She even bathes and sleeps with it. Because of her powers to see into other people's dreams, Touko's left eye serves as a window in which her clients can see their dreams through, because of this she can only cry in her right eye.
  - Kayousei Yume Tsukai (Tuesday Star)
 
 At 10 years old, Rinko is the youngest member of the Yume Tsukai. Unlike her sister, Rinko is more active and gung ho and is always ready for action. Smart, yet impatient, she is usually the first to act when it comes to seeking out the nightmares that pop up. She claims to be a Super Elementary School Student.

 - Kinyousei Yume Tsukai (Friday Star)
 
 Aloof, eclectic, and somewhat having a lolita complex (perhaps in jest), Hajime is the oldest of the Yume Tsukai. Having a flair for the dramatics, he battles nightmares in alongside Touko and Rinko. In the manga, his lolita complex is for certain, but that goes more along with the much more adult tone of the manga.

  - Doyousei Yume Tsukai (Saturday Star)
 
 Shy and timid Satoka joined the Yume Tsukai after her boyfriend, Satoru, another Yume Tsukai, was killed.  She still carries the burden of his death, but later on finds the strength to carry on the title of Doyousei. Satoka lives in Nagasaki, on the southern island of Kyūshū. She is very well off, having a limo, butler, and a private jet, but states she's not that rich. She wears Satoru's hat and seems to always be with her. Unlike Touko's mask, she takes it off when needed. Satoka is still new to the Yume Tsukai, so she is receiving lessons from Rinko, who blasts at her to call her senpai.

 
 
 Aunt to the sisters from their father's side, Misako is the 29-year-old virgin that unseals the Dream Cyclone weapon for the Yume Tsukai. She spends time at the family house where the Dream Cyclone shrine resides, waiting for the call to arms when the team is out on a job. Misako is very up-to-date with technology, but limits herself to her cellphone and computer. Being very sensitive about her age, she makes a point to let everyone know she's 29, and not 30.

External links
  (archive) 
 

Kodansha manga
Madhouse (company)
Seinen manga